The 1931 Holy Cross Crusaders football team was an American football team that represented the College of the Holy Cross as an independent during the 1931 college football season.  In its second season under head coach John McEwan, the team compiled a 7–2–1 record. The team played its home games at Fitton Field in Worcester, Massachusetts.

Schedule

References

Holy Cross
Holy Cross Crusaders football seasons
Holy Cross Crusaders football